Gautam Chakroborty (1954 – 27 May 2022) was a Bangladesh Nationalist Party politician and a Jatiya Sangsad member representing the Tangail-6 constituency. He also served as the state minister of water resources.

Early life
Born in Pakistan, Gautam received his education up to LLB.

Career
Chakroborty was elected to parliament from Tangail-6 (Nagarpur-Delduar) in 1996 and 2001 as a candidate of Bangladesh Nationalist Party (BNP) beating Bangladesh Awami League candidate Khondokar Abdul Baten twice. He received the nomination from the party in the 2008 Bangladesh General Election but lost the contest to Ahasanul Islam Titu of Awami League.

Death
Chakroborty died from cardiac arrest in the afternoon/evening according to reports on 27 May 2022.

References

20th-century births
2022 deaths
People from Tangail District
Bangladesh Nationalist Party politicians
State Ministers of Water Resources (Bangladesh)
7th Jatiya Sangsad members
8th Jatiya Sangsad members
Bangladeshi Hindus
Year of birth missing